Dayamis Chinea Carrazana (born 15 September 2002) is a Cuban footballer who plays as a centre back for FC Villa Clara and the Cuba women's national team.

Club career
Chinea has played for Villa Clara in Cuba.

International career
Chinea represented Cuba at the 2022 CONCACAF Women's U-20 Championship. She capped at senior level during the 2022 CONCACAF W Championship qualification.

References

2002 births
Living people
Cuban women's footballers
Women's association football central defenders
FC Villa Clara players
Cuba women's international footballers